Henry Hu Hung-lick  GBM GBS JP (born 20 January 1920) is a barrister in Hong Kong, formerly served as the vice-chairman of the Reform Club, Legislative Council member, and vice-chairperson of Urban Council during 1 April 1975 to 31 March 1979.

Diplomat career 
Born in a poor family, Hu only received education starting from 9, but finished all primary education within 2.5 years, and earned an excellent result in secondary school admission examination among all students in Chekiang. Henry Hu graduated from the National University of Political Science in 1942 where he studied diplomacy.

In 1945, Henry Hu, along with his just-married wife, went to Tashkent, Soviet Union to begin his diplomat career. Following the change of regime in China which the Republic of China retreated to Taiwan, he decided to study in University of Paris and received doctoral degree and Diploma of High Studies in International Law and International Affairs in 1952, and qualified as a barrister in the UK in 1954, and began his legal practice upon his return to Hong Kong a year later.

Hu, a pro-China patriot, eventually gave up to be barrister in Hong Kong, reportedly because of his unwillingness to revoke his Chinese nationality. During his legal practice in Hong Kong, Hu handled some infamous cases, including Happy Valley Cardboard Box murder.

Political career 
Henry Hu was elected to the Urban Council in 1965, criticised the government to increase the fare of Star Ferry foot-passenger. Hu then was appointed to the Legislative Council in 1976 as unofficial member, and met Chinese leader Deng Xiaoping in 1979, becoming the first Hong Kong legislator entering PRC. His Legco member term ended in 1983, and entered Chinese People's Political Consultative Conference four years later.

Personal life 
Hu married Chung Chi-yung; together they had two children.  They co-founded Hong Kong Shue Yan College, which would be the first private university in Hong Kong.

References

Urban Council, Urban Council Annual Report, 1974
Hong Kong Newspaper Clippings Online

1920 births
Living people
Recipients of the Gold Bauhinia Star
Recipients of the Grand Bauhinia Medal
Members of the Urban Council of Hong Kong
Place of birth missing (living people)
Reform Club of Hong Kong politicians
Politicians from Shaoxing
Members of the National Committee of the Chinese People's Political Consultative Conference
Members of the Preparatory Committee for the Hong Kong Special Administrative Region
Barristers of Hong Kong
Members of the Selection Committee of Hong Kong
Hong Kong centenarians
Men centenarians
Members of the Election Committee of Hong Kong, 2021–2026
Chinese emigrants to British Hong Kong